Ansco Jan Heeble Dokkum (9 May 1904, Sneek – 30 December 1985, Amsterdam) was a sailor from the Netherlands, who represented his native country as  at the 1936 Summer Olympics in Kiel. Dokkum, as crew member on the Dutch 6 Metre De Ruyter, took the 8th place with helmsman Joop Carp and fellow crew members: Ernst Moltzer, Kees Jonker and Herman Looman.

Before his sailing career, Ansco Dokkkum rowed for the Netherlands during the 1928 Summer Olympics in Amsterdam. In the Nereus Coxless four, he took 6th place with his team mates Simon Bon, Egbertus Waller and Paul Maasland.

Ansco Dokkum was chef d' mission of the Dutch team for 1968 Summer Olympics.

References 
 
 
 
 

1904 births
1985 deaths
Dutch male rowers
Dutch male sailors (sport)
Olympic rowers of the Netherlands
Olympic sailors of the Netherlands
Rowers at the 1928 Summer Olympics
Sailors at the 1936 Summer Olympics – 6 Metre
People from Sneek
Dutch referees and umpires
Sportspeople from Friesland
20th-century Dutch people